Forever and Ever is an album by Greek singer Demis Roussos. It was released in 1973 on Philips Records. A greatly popular album, it also topped the international albums charts in Germany, Netherlands and Norway and was number 2 in Austria.

In 1973 Roussos released a Spanish-language version of this album, titled Eternamente.

Track listing

Personnel
 Bass – Bernard Rosati
 Backing vocals – attributed to "all friends"
 Bouzouki – Orphe
 Drums – P. Jean
 Engineer – Roger Roche
 Flute – Chris Hayward
 Guitar, Twelve-String Guitar – Jean-Jacques Cramier
 Keyboards, Organ – Stelios Vlavianos
 Lead Guitar, Guitar – A. Caracadas
 Photography – Bernard Leloup
 Trombone – Alex Perdigon, G. Conti

Charts

Weekly charts

Re-release

Year-end charts

Certifications and sales

References

External links
 Discogs.com: Demis Roussos - Forever and Ever

1973 albums
Demis Roussos albums
Philips Records albums